Sareth Krya (born 3 March 1996) is a Cambodian footballer who plays as a defender. He plays his domestic football for Svay Rieng FC and also represents the Cambodian national football team.

Career statistics

International goals
Scores and results list Cambodia's goal tally first.

References

Cambodian footballers
1996 births
Living people
Association football defenders
Preah Khan Reach Svay Rieng FC players
Cambodia international footballers